A walking trip, on roads and trails, can be done from Dili on the north coast through to Betano on the south coast via Mt Ramelau, the highest peak in the country. Follows the travels of Australian soldiers of Sparrow Force during World War 2. Allows a unique glimpse of the daily life of the East Timorese, walking through villages and towns, and sampling the warm hospitality of the people.

Hiking in East Timor
Tourist attractions in East Timor